Christopher Drazan (born 2 October 1990) is an Austrian football midfielder.

International
On 19 August 2008, Drazan made his debut in the starting eleven of the Austrian U-21 team against Ireland, being substituted in the 46th minute.

Personal life
His father is the former FK Austria Wien player Fritz Drazan.

References

External links
 Christopher Drazan at rapidarchiv.at 
 
 
 

1990 births
Living people
Austrian footballers
Austrian expatriate footballers
Austria under-21 international footballers
Association football wingers
SK Rapid Wien players
Austria international footballers
1. FC Kaiserslautern players
FC Rot-Weiß Erfurt players
SKN St. Pölten players
SC Austria Lustenau players
LASK players
FC Admira Wacker Mödling players
FC Vaduz players
Austrian expatriate sportspeople in Liechtenstein
Expatriate footballers in Liechtenstein
3. Liga players
2. Bundesliga players
Austrian Football Bundesliga players
2. Liga (Austria) players
Swiss Challenge League players
Austrian expatriate sportspeople in Germany
Austrian expatriate sportspeople in Switzerland
Expatriate footballers in Germany
Expatriate footballers in Switzerland